Austrolimnophila is a subgenus of crane fly in the family Limoniidae.

Species

A. acanthophallus Alexander, 1955
A. accola Alexander, 1961
A. acutergata Alexander, 1939
A. agathicola Alexander, 1952
A. agma Alexander, 1972
A. aka Theischinger, 2000
A. amatrix Alexander, 1960
A. analis (Santos Abreu, 1923)
A. anjouanensis Alexander, 1979
A. antiqua (Skuse, 1890)
A. argus (Hutton, 1900)
A. asiatica (Alexander, 1925)
A. aspidophora Alexander, 1955
A. atripes (Alexander, 1922)
A. autumnalis (Alexander, 1929)
A. badia (Doane, 1900)
A. bifidaria Alexander, 1942
A. birungana (Alexander, 1924)
A. bradleyi Alexander, 1929
A. brevicellula Stary, 1977
A. bulbulifera Alexander, 1948
A. buxtoni Alexander, 1956
A. byersiana Alexander, 1968
A. candiditarsis Alexander, 1937
A. canuta Alexander, 1958
A. caparaoensis Alexander, 1944
A. chiloeana Alexander, 1953
A. chrysorrhoea (Edwards, 1923)
A. claduroneura (Speiser, 1909)
A. claduroneurodes Alexander, 1956
A. collessiana Theischinger, 1996
A. comantis Alexander, 1948
A. crassipes (Hutton, 1900)
A. croceipennis Alexander, 1962
A. cyatheti (Edwards, 1923)
A. cyclopica Alexander, 1947
A. danbulla Theischinger, 1996
A. deltoides Alexander, 1960
A. diacanthophora Alexander, 1962
A. diffusa (Alexander, 1920)
A. discoboloides Alexander, 1947
A. dislocata Alexander, 1961
A. distigma (Alexander, 1920)
A. duseni (Alexander, 1920)
A. echidna Alexander, 1956
A. elnora Alexander, 1929
A. ephippigera Alexander, 1946
A. erecta (Alexander, 1934)
A. eucharis Alexander, 1962
A. eutaeniata (Bigot, 1888)
A. excelsior Alexander, 1960
A. exsanguis Alexander, 1955
A. fluxa Alexander, 1936
A. fulvipennis (Alexander, 1921)
A. fuscohalterata Alexander, 1929
A. geographica (Hutton, 1900)
A. griseiceps (Alexander, 1921)
A. hausa Alexander, 1974
A. hazelae Alexander, 1929
A. hoogstraali Alexander, 1972
A. horii (Alexander, 1925)
A. illustris (Alexander, 1923)
A. infidelis Alexander, 1929
A. interjecta Alexander, 1936
A. interventa (Skuse, 1890)
A. iris Alexander, 1929
A. irwinsmithae Alexander, 1937
A. japenensis Alexander, 1947
A. joana Alexander, 1929
A. jobiensis Alexander, 1947
A. kirishimensis (Alexander, 1925)
A. laetabunda Alexander, 1960
A. lambi (Edwards, 1923)
A. latistyla Stary, 1977
A. leleupi Alexander, 1962
A. leucomelas (Edwards, 1923)
A. lewisiana Theischinger, 1996
A. linae Alexander, 1947
A. lobophora Alexander, 1960
A. luteipleura Alexander, 1949
A. macrophallus Alexander, 1958
A. macropyga Alexander, 1953
A. mannheimsi Alexander, 1960
A. marcida (Alexander, 1924)
A. marshalli (Hutton, 1900)
A. martinezi Alexander, 1957
A. medialis (Alexander, 1921)
A. megapophysis Alexander, 1979
A. merklei Alexander, 1928
A. michaelseni Alexander, 1929
A. microspilota Alexander, 1943
A. microsticta Alexander, 1929
A. minor Alexander, 1962
A. mobilis (Alexander, 1934)
A. multiscripta Alexander, 1960
A. multitergata Alexander, 1962
A. munifica Alexander, 1928
A. nahuelicola Alexander, 1957
A. natalensis (Alexander, 1921)
A. nebrias Alexander, 1962
A. neuquenensis Alexander, 1952
A. nigrocincta (Edwards, 1923)
A. nokonis (Alexander, 1928)
A. norrisiana Theischinger, 1996
A. nympha Alexander, 1943
A. obliquata (Alexander, 1922)
A. ochracea (Meigen, 1804)
A. oculata (Edwards, 1923)
A. oroensis Alexander, 1943
A. orthia (Alexander, 1924)
A. pacifera Alexander, 1937
A. pallidistyla Alexander, 1942
A. percara Alexander, 1957
A. percincta Alexander, 1955
A. peremarginata Alexander, 1955
A. persessilis Alexander, 1939
A. petasma Alexander, 1961
A. phantasma Alexander, 1956
A. platensis (Alexander, 1923)
A. platyterga Alexander, 1958
A. pleurolineata Alexander, 1957
A. pleurostria Alexander, 1958
A. plumbeipleura Alexander, 1949
A. polydamas Alexander, 1960
A. polyspilota Alexander, 1937
A. praepostera Alexander, 1956
A. pristina (Alexander, 1924)
A. proximata (Alexander, 1926)
A. punctipennis (Philippi, 1866)
A. recens (Alexander, 1921)
A. relicta Alexander, 1928
A. robinsoni Alexander, 1958
A. saturnina Alexander, 1961
A. septifera Alexander, 1968
A. spectabilis (Alexander, 1921)
A. spinicaudata Alexander, 1937
A. stemma (Alexander, 1922)
A. stenoptera Alexander, 1981
A. sternolobata Alexander, 1957
A. strigimacula (Edwards, 1923)
A. striopleura Alexander, 1960
A. styx Alexander, 1965
A. subinterventa (Edwards, 1923)
A. subpacifera Alexander, 1942
A. subsessilis Alexander, 1970
A. superstes Alexander, 1960
A. tanana Alexander, 1972
A. tenuilobata Alexander, 1942
A. tergifera Alexander, 1953
A. tergofurcata Alexander, 1965
A. terpsis Alexander, 1960
A. thornei (Wood, 1952)
A. toxoneura (Osten Sacken, 1860)
A. transvaalica (Alexander, 1917)
A. tremula Alexander, 1929
A. trifidula Alexander, 1960
A. tsaratananae Alexander, 1955
A. tunguraguensis Alexander, 1940
A. varitarsis Alexander, 1929
A. vivasberthieri Alexander, 1938
A. volentis Alexander, 1951
A. wilfredlongi Alexander, 1952
A. wilhelminae Alexander, 1960
A. wygodzinskyi Alexander, 1948
A. xanthoptera Alexander, 1929
A. yoruba Alexander, 1974
A. yumotana (Alexander, 1934)

References

Limoniidae
Taxa named by Jacques-Marie-Frangile Bigot
Insect subgenera